Philotarsus kwakiutl is a species of loving barklouse in the family Philotarsidae. It is found in North America.

References

Psocomorpha
Articles created by Qbugbot
Insects described in 1951